Dilla District is a district in the northwestern Awdal region of Somaliland. Its capital lies at Dilla.

Demographics
This district is exclusively inhabited by the Mohamuud Nuur, one of the two sub divisions of Reer Nuur, a clan of the Makahiil Gadabuursi.

R.J Hayward and I.M. Lewis (2005) both state that Dilla is the major town and region of the Reer Mohamuud Nuur:
"The major town of the Rer Mohamoud Nur, Dila."

See also

Administrative divisions of Somaliland
Regions of Somaliland
Districts of Somaliland

References

Districts of Somaliland
Awdal